(born on March 25, 1966) is a Japanese voice actress who is best known for voicing Himeno Awayuki in Prétear and Inaba Mizuki in Full Metal Panic!. She also voiced Rubette la Lette in Gokudo and recorded on the Macross Generation series of albums.

Filmography

Anime

Video games

Drama CDs

Dubbing
 Paw Patrol (Yumi)

References

External links
 

Japanese voice actresses
Living people
1966 births